Biota is a municipality (pop. 1,202) in the Spanish province of Zaragoza, in the autonomous community of Aragon.

References 

Municipalities in the Province of Zaragoza